Newroz International Stadium is a football stadium in Sulaymaniyah, Iraq, that is currently under construction. Once completed, it will be used mostly for football matches and will host the home matches of Newroz SC. The stadium will have a capacity of 14,500 spectators.

See also 
List of football stadiums in Iraq

References

Football venues in Iraq
Football venues in Iraqi Kurdistan
Stadiums under construction